Bilal Bari (born 19 January 1998) is a professional footballer who plays as a striker for Levski Sofia in the Bulgarian First League. Born in France, he has represented Morocco at youth international levels (under-20 and under-23).

Professional career
On 23 May 2018, Bari signed his first professional contract with his childhood club RC Lens. Bari made his professional debut with Lens in a 2–0 Ligue 2 win over US Orléans on 27 July 2018. On 27 August he was loaned out at RS Berkane, playing one season for them in the Moroccan Botola. In the summer of 2019 he signed with the Romanian CS Concordia Chiajna . He played 22 games and scored 2 goals for The Eagles in the Romanian second tier division.

On 2 September 2019 he signed with the Bulgarian elite FC Montana. After playing just half season with the Northwest Bulgarian team he was signed by one of the country's grand teams - Levski Sofia. He made his league debut for the Blues on 21 February 2021 against Etar. By the end of the season he appeared in eight more games, but he wasn't able to net a single goal. He scored his first goal for Levski on 16 October the same year against Lokomotiv Sofia, netting the second goal in a 2-1 away win. By the end of the half season he played eight more league games (playing the full match each time) and scored four more goals, some of them crucial. Furthermore he is the outfield player who played most minutes for the first half season for Levski, starting each game and being substituted in only two. He also scored a hat-trick at the 2021–22 Bulgarian Cup round of 16 game against Septemvri Simitli.

International career
Born in France, Bari is of Moroccan descent. He represented the Morocco U20 in their victorious campaign in the 2017 Jeux de la Francophonie. He debuted for the Morocco U23s in a 1–0 friendly loss to the Senegal U23 on 24 March 2018.

Career statistics

Club

Honours
Morocco U20
 Jeux de la Francophonie: 2017

Levski Sofia
 Bulgarian Cup: 2021–22

References

External links

Bilal Bari at Footballdatabase

1998 births
Living people
People from Lens, Pas-de-Calais
Sportspeople from Pas-de-Calais
Footballers from Hauts-de-France
Moroccan footballers
Moroccan expatriate footballers
French expatriate footballers
Morocco youth international footballers
French footballers
French sportspeople of Moroccan descent
Association football forwards
Ligue 2 players
Botola players
Liga II players
First Professional Football League (Bulgaria) players
RC Lens players
CS Concordia Chiajna players
FC Montana players
Moroccan expatriate sportspeople in Romania
French expatriate sportspeople in Romania
Expatriate footballers in Romania
Moroccan expatriate sportspeople in Bulgaria
French expatriate sportspeople in Bulgaria
Expatriate footballers in Bulgaria